Wahlenbergia graniticola is a herbaceous plant in the family Campanulaceae native to New South Wales.

References

rupicola
Flora of New South Wales
Taxa named by Jeremy James Bruhl